De Poelen or De Puollen  is a smock mill in Dronryp, Friesland, Netherlands, which was built in 1850. The mill is listed as a Rijksmonument, number 28612.

History

De Poelen was built in 1850 to drain the  Oosterpolder. During its working life, the mill was fitted with Patent sails which had Dekkerised leading edges. The mill was restored in 1984–85, after years out of use and in decline. De Poelen was officially reopened on 27 April 1985. The mill now only pumps water in a circuit for demonstration purposes.

Description

De Poelen is a three-storey smock mill on a single-storey base. There is no stage, the sail reaching almost to the ground. The smock and cap thatched. The mill is winded by tailpole and winch. The sails are Common sails. The sails are carried on a cast-iron windshaft, which is bored through to take the striking rod for Patent sails. The windshaft also carries the brake wheel which has 58 cogs. This drives the wallower (35 cogs) at  the top of the upright shaft. At the bottom of the upright shaft, the crown wheel, which has 53 cogs drives a gearwheel with 38 cogs on the axle of the Archimedes' screw. The screw is inclined at 20°. Each revolution of the screw lifts  of water.

Public access
De Poelen is open to the public by appointment.

References

Windmills in Friesland
Windmills completed in 1850
Smock mills in the Netherlands
Windpumps in the Netherlands
Rijksmonuments in Friesland
Octagonal buildings in the Netherlands
Waadhoeke